Oleg Leonidovich Salyukov (born 21 May 1955) is an Army General and the current Commander-in-Chief of the Russian Ground Forces. He was appointed to the post in May 2014. He was promoted to the rank of General of the Army in 2019.

Education
In 1977, he graduated from the Ulyanovsk Guards Higher Tank Command School, in 1985 from the Malinovsky Military Armored Forces Academy and in 1996 from the Military Academy of the General Staff of the Armed Forces of Russia.

Career

2022 Russian invasion of Ukraine 
In February 2022 Salyukov was added to the European Union sanctions list for being "responsible for actively supporting and implementing actions and policies that undermine and threaten the territorial integrity, sovereignty and independence of Ukraine as well as the stability or security in Ukraine".

References

Commanders-in-chief of the Russian Army
Generals of the army (Russia)
1955 births
Living people
Recipients of the Order of Military Merit (Russia)
Military Academy of the General Staff of the Armed Forces of Russia alumni
Russian individuals subject to European Union sanctions